Antonis Minou (born 4 May 1958) is a Greek former professional footballer who played as a goalkeeper.

Club career
Minou took his first football steps in Almopos Aridea and to Kastoria in 1980 and two years later to Panathinaikos, where he became known to the general public and was called to the national team. At Panathinaikos he won two league titles and three cups. However, the difficult competition with Nikos Sarganis forced him to look for another football team and in the summer of 1988 he was transferred to AEK Athens. In his first season in the team, he was a second choice behind Spyros Ikonomopoulos, but after the following season he became a regular and then never lost his place again, until the end of his spell at AEK. The decision by the club's management to release him in the summer of 1993 caused quite a surprise, since he was the first-choice goalkeeper in his last two seasons in which the team won the respective championships, while also playing in the national team. With AEK he won three championships, one Super Cup and one League Cup. After leaving AEK, Minou joined Apollon Athens, where he played for three season before ending his playing career.

International career
Minou played in a total of 16 matches with Greece. He played for the first time on 8 October 1986, in an away friendly match against Italy, when under the instructions of Miltos Papapostolou replaced Theologis Papadopoulos in the second half. He was part of the squad that traveled to the USA for the 1994 FIFA World Cup, where he played in the opening match against Argentina. He also competed with the Olympic team in 1983.

Managerial career
After the end of his career he became involved in coaching, while in the period 1997–98, he was initially the assistant coach of Dumitru Dumitriu at AEK Athens and after the later was sacked, he his replacement until the end of the season. Later he was assistant of Fernando Santos in AEK and in Greece.

Honours

Panathinaikos
Alpha Ethniki:  1983–84, 1985–86
Greek Cup: 1983–84, 1985–86, 1987–88

AEK Athens
Alpha Ethniki: 1988–89, 1991–92, 1992–93
Greek Super Cup: 1989
Greek League Cup: 1990

References

External links

1958 births
Living people
Greek footballers
Greece international footballers
Greek football managers
Panathinaikos F.C. players
AEK Athens F.C. players
Apollon Smyrnis F.C. players
Kastoria F.C. players
AEK Athens F.C. managers
1994 FIFA World Cup players
Super League Greece players
Association football goalkeepers
Footballers from Aridaia